Troels Nielsen (born 1982) better known by his stage name Troo.L.S is a multiple award winning Danish musician and music producer from Albertslund, a suburb of Copenhagen.

His career debut was in the local Danish hip hop group Sidste Niveau. He also contributed to the group Suspekt and their self-titled album "Suspekt" in 1999. He later joined Suspekt, where he wrote, co-composed and also featured as a rapper on "Ingen Slukker The Stars", 2003 and "Prima Nocte", 2007.

In the 2005 an album called "Forklædt Som Voksen", a joint venture with Danish rapper Orgi-E, was released.

Troo.L.S' musical collaborations include Danish artists like: L.O.C., U$O, Marwan, Drengene Fra Angora, Den Gale Pose, Johnson, Anders "Anden" Matthesen, etc.

With Rune Rask, he co-wrote and composed the song "Gangsta Bop" that appears on Akon's album "Konvicted".

For which the two received a Grammy Nomination.

In late 2007 he left Suspekt and subsequently signed to Akon's label Konvict and relocated to Atlanta, GA.

His productions feature artists such as Snoop Dogg, The Game and TechN9ne.

Troo.L.S currently resides in Los Angeles, CA.

Discography

Albums

References

External links
Myspace

Danish rappers
Danish record producers
1982 births
Living people
People from Albertslund Municipality